The Flöha is a river in Saxony, Germany, and the Czech Republic. It flows into the river Zschopau in the town Flöha.

See also 
List of rivers of Saxony
List of rivers of the Czech Republic

References 

Rivers of Saxony
Rivers of the Ústí nad Labem Region
International rivers of Europe
Rivers of Germany